The Escambia-class oilers were a class of twelve T2-SE-A2 tankers that served in the United States Navy, built during World War II. The ships were named for United States rivers with Native American names. They were very similar to the Suamico class (of which they are sometimes accounted a subclass), differing principally in having the more powerful turboelectric plant of the P2-SE2 transports which developed 10,000 shp.

All of the ships were decommissioned and transferred to the Military Sea Transportation Service in the post-war period. Several were later transferred to the United States Army and converted to floating electricity generating stations, and served in that role in Vietnam.

Ships
 , 1943 
 , 1943
 , ex-Lackawapen, 1944
 , 1944
 , 1943
 , 1943
 , 1944
 , 1944
 , 1944
 , ex-Mission San Xavier, converted to AW-3
 , ex-Mission San Lorenzo, converted to AW-4
 , ex-Mission Santa Ana, converted to water supply ship.
 , ex-Mission Alamo, 1945
 , ex-Mission Los Angeles, 1945
 , ex-Mission San Francisco, 1945

See also

United States Navy oiler
T2 tanker

 

 
Turbo-electric steamships